The 2016 Torneo de Mendoza was a professional tennis tournament played on clay courts. It was the first edition of the tournament, which was part of the 2016 ATP Challenger Tour. It took place in Mendoza, Argentina from 5 to 10 January 2016.

Singles main-draw entrants

Seeds 

 Rankings are as of December 28, 2015.

Other entrants 
The following players received wildcards into the singles main draw:
  Francisco Bahamonde
  Andrea Collarini  
  Gianni Mina 
  Juan Pablo Paz

The following players received entry from the qualifying draw:
  Maximiliano Estévez
  Juan Ignacio Galarza
  Thiago Monteiro
  Peter Torebko

Champions

Singles

 Gerald Melzer def.  Axel Michon  4–6, 6–4, 6–0

Doubles

 Máximo González /  José Hernández def.  Julio Peralta /  Horacio Zeballos 4–6, 6–3, [10–1]

External links

Torneo de Mendoza
Torneo de Mendoza